Meet My Folks is a comedy reality television series which aired on NBC from 2002–2003 and aired in re-runs on MyNetworkTV from 2007–2008. Local versions of the show have aired in other countries since 2000.

The series was apparently inspired by, but has no direct connection to, the 2000 comedy film Meet the Parents, wherein a man must seek the approval of his girlfriend's demanding parents before proposing. One of the film's best-known elements, a lie detector test, also figures prominently in the series. The film's producers, Universal Studios (now under common ownership with NBC), had at one point considered legal action over the program, specifically the title and the lie detector segment, but this did not come to fruition.

Plot
On this show, three bachelors spend three days with the possible "woman or man of their dreams" and her or his family in their home, with conversations and interaction intended to reveal the bachelors' character and intentions. The winner gets a week in Hawaii with "Miss Right," if her or his family approves.

Episodes

Season 1 (2002)

Season 2 (2003)

References

External links
 
 Official Website (via Internet Archive)
 https://web.archive.org/web/20080507053430/http://www.mynetworktv.com/shows.php?show=30
 http://www.sirlinksalot.net/meetmyfolks.html

2002 American television series debuts
2003 American television series endings
NBC original programming
MyNetworkTV original programming
2000s American reality television series
2000s American comedy television series